The 1994–95 Superliga Espanola de Hockey Hielo season was the 21st season of the Superliga Espanola de Hockey Hielo, the top level of ice hockey in Spain. Five teams participated in the league, and CH Txuri Urdin won the championship.

First round

Playoffs

External links
Season on hockeyarchives.info

Liga Nacional de Hockey Hielo seasons
Spa
Liga